is a former Japanese football player.

Club statistics

References

External links

1980 births
Living people
Association football people from Kanagawa Prefecture
Japanese footballers
J2 League players
Japan Football League players
Tokushima Vortis players
Association football goalkeepers